Familie Benthin is an East German film. It was released in 1950.

Plot
Theo and Gustav Benthin are two brothers who operate a smuggling network: Theo, a factory director in East Germany, illegally transfers goods to his brother on the other side of the border, and the latter sells them in West Germany. The two also employ another pair of brothers, Peter and Klaus Naumann. Theo is caught by the People's Police; Gustav cannot compete in the wild capitalist market without the cheap merchandise from the East and his business collapses. Peter Naumann moves to the Federal Republic, but there he finds only unemployment and is eventually to join the French Foreign Legion. Klaus remains in the East and finds a promising job as a steel worker.

Cast
Maly Delschaft - Annemarie Naumann
Charlotte Ander - Olga Benthin
Hans-Georg Rudolph - Theo Benthin
Werner Pledath - Gustav Benthin
Brigitte Conrad - Ursel Benthin
Harry Hindemith - Seidel
Karl-Heinz Deickert - Klaus Neumann
Ottokar Runze - Peter Naumann

Production
The Benthin Family was DEFA's first major "mission film", with a clear, state-directed political message, although pictures that presented narratives hostile to West Germany and to the West in general were already made, albeit with smaller budgets and less government attention.

Three directors - Slatan Dudow, Richard Groschopp and Kurt Maetzig - were instructed by Socialist Unity Party of Germany to work on the film. Later, none of them was willing to accept responsibility for the outcome.

Reception
East German cinema expert Joshua Feinstein wrote that The Benthin Family "...seems to have been an unmitigated disaster." The SED newspaper Neues Deutschland praised the film, noting that "its greatness lies in its realization of the greatness of our life today..." while contrasting them with "the other side... where the West German youth... are processed for service as mercenaries for the imperialists." At 1952, the censure demanded that a scene in which a drunk worker appeared be removed before the film was allowed to be re-screened, since it did not comply with "depicting independent, intelligent members of the proletariat".

The German Film Lexicon defined The Benthin Family as a "SED-commissioned agitation thriller with simplistic good-versus-evil plot... but interesting as a Cold War relic."

References

External links
 
 Familie Benthin on DEFA Sternstunden.

1950 films
East German films
1950s German-language films
Films directed by Kurt Maetzig
Films directed by Richard Groschopp
Films directed by Slatan Dudow
German crime drama films
1950 crime drama films
German black-and-white films
1950s German films